Milan Zgrablić (born 29 August 1960) is a Croatian prelate the Catholic Church who currently serves as the archbishop of Zadar since 2023. From 2022 he was the archbishop coadjutor, succeeding Želimir Puljić after his retirement in 2023 as the archbishop.

Early life and education 

Bishop Zgrablić was born as the fifth child into a Catholic family of Josip and Josipa Zgrablić in the upper Adriatic coast of Croatia.

After graduating the primary school in Pazin in 1976 and Minor Seminary in Pazin (1976–1978), he attended the gymnasium at the Zmajević Minor Seminary in Zadar (1978–1980) and consequently joined the Major Theological Seminary in Rijeka and in the same time to the University of Rijeka, where studied until 1986, and was ordained as priest on 8 June 1986 for the Diocese of Poreč-Pula, after completed his philosophical and theological studies. From 1992 until 1994 he continued his postgraduate studies in spirituality at the Pontifical Gregorian University in Rome, Italy.

Pastoral work 

After his ordination to the priesthood, he was the parish vicar in Rovinj (1986–1987), prefect of the Archdiocesan Zmajević Minor Seminary in Zadar (1987–1990), and after returning to his Diocese of Poreč-Pula, he was the diocesan commissioner for spiritual vocations (1990–1992). When returned from Rome, Fr. Zgrablić served as head of the Pazin College with the Classical Gymnasium (1994–1997), when he took over the position of director of the diocesan Caritas until 2007. At the same time, he was a parish priest in Rovinj for eight years (1997–2015). Since 2008, he has also run the Diocesan Institution for the Support of Clergy and Other Church Officials. From September 2015 until April 2022, he was appointed cathedral pastor in Cathedral Basilica of the Assumption of Mary in Poreč and since 2019, he has been a canon of the Cathedral of St. Mavra in Poreč.

Prelate 

On 7 April 2022, Fr. Zgrablić was appointed by Pope Francis as a Coadjutor Archbishop of the Roman Catholic Archdiocese of Zadar and his consecration took place on 25 June 2022 in the Cathedral of St. Anastasia in Zadar.

References 

1960 births
Living people
People from Pazin
University of Rijeka alumni
Pontifical Gregorian University alumni
20th-century Croatian Roman Catholic priests
Archbishops of Zadar
Bishops appointed by Pope Francis
21st-century Roman Catholic archbishops in Croatia